Texas Township may refer to the following places in the United States:

 Texas Township, Lee County, Arkansas, in Lee County, Arkansas
 Texas Township, Craighead County, Arkansas, in Craighead County, Arkansas
 Texas Township, DeWitt County, Illinois
 Texas Township, Kalamazoo County, Michigan
 Texas Township, Dent County, Missouri
 Texas Township, Crawford County, Ohio
 Texas Township, Cotton County, Oklahoma
 Texas Township, Washita County, Oklahoma
 Texas Township, Wayne County, Pennsylvania

See also
Texas (disambiguation)

Township name disambiguation pages